Archisaccophyllia is a genus of putative sea anemone whose true affinity remains unclear.

References

Actiniaria
Cnidarian families